is a Japanese retired footballer.

National team career
In July 2007, he was elected Japan U-20 national team for 2007 U-20 World Cup. At this tournament, he played full-time in all four matches as captain.

Club statistics
Updated to 23 February 2017.

National team career statistics

Appearances in major competitions

Honours

Club
Gamba Osaka
AFC Champions League (1) : 2008
Emperor's Cup (1) : 2008
Pan-Pacific Championship (1) : 2008

References

External links

1987 births
Living people
Association football people from Ōita Prefecture
Japanese footballers
Japan youth international footballers
J1 League players
J2 League players
Oita Trinita players
Gamba Osaka players
JEF United Chiba players
Tokushima Vortis players
Renofa Yamaguchi FC players
Verspah Oita players
Association football defenders